Republic road I-2 is a major road in Northeastern Bulgaria. It runs between Danube Bridge, at the Danube border with Romania, and Varna, at the Black Sea coast. In half of its length, between Shumen and Varna, it is superseded by Hemus motorway (A2).

Description
Road I-2 begins from Danube Bridge, at the Danube border with Romania. The road bypasses Ruse, the fifth largest city in Bulgaria, and then runs southeast. It crosses the small town of Tsar Kaloyan, bypasses Razgrad and continues towards Shumen, the 10th largest city in Bulgaria. In 2012, road I-2 between Ruse and Shumen was expanded up to 3-lane single carriageway.

At the Belokopitovo interchange, road I-2 links with the Hemus motorway (A2). The connection was officially inaugurated on August 3, 2015. Between Shumen and the Black Sea coast at Varna, the second largest city in Bulgaria, the road runs parallel to Hemus motorway as a 2-lane single carriageway.

References

External links
 Road network of Bulgaria RIA

Roads in Bulgaria
European route E85